Chipe libre (lit: Free Opportunity) is a Chilean comedy television series created by Carla Stagno, José Fonseca, Pablo Toro, and Anneke Munita, that was broadcast on Canal 13, from August 3, 2014, to January 26, 2015, starring Fernanda Urrejola and Nicolás Poblete as Julieta and Gonzalo, a couple whose tumultuous feelings for each other finally make them bored, and separately with a "Free Opportunity" agreement, they need to rebuild his life from zero.

Cast

Main characters 
 Fernanda Urrejola as Julieta Ruiz.
 Nicolás Poblete as Gonzalo Hernández.
 Juanita Ringeling as Sofía Villaroel (alias Rucia).
 Mario Horton as Franco Zanetti.
 Carolina Varleta as Bernandita Patiño / Macarena Vergara.
 Javiera Díaz de Valdés as Isabel Urrejola.
 Loreto Aravena as Catalina Pardo.
 Pablo Macaya as Cristóbal Ramos (alias Crili).

Supporting characters 
 Elvira Cristi as Bárbara Andrade.
 Gloria Münchmeyer as Violeta Riesco.
 Jaime Vadell as Germán Hernández.
 Catalina Guerra as Antonieta Hernández.
 Héctor Morales as Axel Ulloa.
 Solange Lackington as Irene Olivares.
 Cristián Campos as César Ruiz.
 Luciana Echeverría as Diana Lagos.
 Pablo Schwarz as Carlos Loyola (alias Sangría).
 Luis Gnecco as Ricardo Felman.
 Teresa Münchmeyer as Paty Navarrete.
 Felipe Pinto as Lucas Ruiz.
 Carolina López as Janis Ortiz.
 Fedra Vergara as Tania Zanetti.

Reception

Television ratings

International broadcast 
 El Salvador: Canal 21.

References

External links 
  

2014 telenovelas
2014 Chilean television series debuts
2015 Chilean television series endings
Chilean telenovelas
Spanish-language telenovelas
Canal 13 (Chilean TV channel) telenovelas
Television shows set in Santiago